Florica Petcu-Dospinescu (born 11 March 1951) is a Romanian rower. She competed at the 1976 Summer Olympics and the 1980 Summer Olympics.

References

External links
 

1951 births
Living people
Romanian female rowers
Olympic rowers of Romania
Rowers at the 1976 Summer Olympics
Rowers at the 1980 Summer Olympics
People from Dâmbovița County
World Rowing Championships medalists for Romania